Kot Qaisrani is a City Located in Dera Ghazi Khan District in the Punjab province of Pakistan. It is the part of Taunsa Sharif It is located at 30°48'0N 70°32'60E.

Populated places in Dera Ghazi Khan District
Union councils of Dera Ghazi Khan District
Cities and towns in Punjab, Pakistan